Rekha Manharlal Doshit was the Chief Justice of Patna High Court, Patna in the Indian state of Bihar. The current chief justice is Justice Sanjay Karol.

Early life and career 
Doshit was born on 13 December 1952 in Rajkot, Gujarat, India. She graduated in Bombay University in Bachelor of Science and Law from Sir L.A. Shah Law College, Ahmedabad. She started her career as an advocate in 1977. In 1995, she was appointed judge at Gujarat High Court. On 21 June 2010, Doshit was promoted to the Chief Justice of Patna High Court, and thus became the first woman Chief Justice of Patna High Court.

References 

Living people
1952 births
Judges of the Gujarat High Court
People from Rajkot
Chief Justices of the Patna High Court
Women educators from Bihar
Educators from Bihar
20th-century Indian judges
20th-century Indian women judges
21st-century Indian judges
21st-century Indian women judges
University of Mumbai alumni